Rosa Georgieva (born December 17, 1956) is a Bulgarian sprint canoer who competed in the late 1970s. She finished ninth in the Women's K-1 500 metres at the 1976 Summer Olympics in Montreal.

References
Sports-reference.com profile

External links

1956 births
Bulgarian female canoeists
Canoeists at the 1976 Summer Olympics
Living people
Olympic canoeists of Bulgaria
Place of birth missing (living people)
20th-century Bulgarian women